Alonso Duralde (born May 18, 1967) is an American film critic, author, and podcaster. He has been a writer and editor for The Wrap, The Advocate and MSNBC.com.

Personal life 
Duralde was born in East Point, Georgia, the youngest of seven children born to Spanish immigrants. He attended Vanderbilt University and currently lives in West Hollywood, California with his husband, fellow writer and film critic Dave White. They co-host the podcast Linoleum Knife, which began in late 2010. He was raised Catholic, but now identifies as an atheist.

In January 2010, Duralde was a contestant on Jeopardy!.

Career 
He was the artistic director at the USA Film Festival/Dallas for five years. He was also the former arts and entertainment editor at the national gay and lesbian magazine The Advocate. In 2007, he became the film critic for MSNBC.com, and in 2009, his reviews began appearing regularly on The Rotten Tomatoes Show.

Duralde is a member of the Los Angeles Film Critics Association and the National Society of Film Critics. His writing has appeared in The Village Voice, Movieline, and Detour.

From 2011 to 2023, Duralde was the senior film critic for The Wrap, which also synidcated his reviews to the Reuters wire. He also co-hosted the TYT Network program What the Flick?! alongside Ben Mankiewicz of Turner Classic Movies, Christy Lemire of The Associated Press and Matt Atchity of Rotten Tomatoes. After What the Flick?! was cancelled, he and Lemire began hosting the film podcast Breakfast All Day.

Preferences

Best films of the year
2011: Weekend
2012: How to Survive a Plague
2013: Frances Ha
2014: Boyhood
2015: Mad Max: Fury Road
2016: Moonlight
2017: Call Me by Your Name
2018: Paddington 2
2019: Little Women
2020: Collective
2021: Licorice Pizza
2022: RRR

Bibliography

References

External links 
 Alonso Duralde's Rotten Tomatoes page
 Linoleum Knife podcast

1967 births
Living people
20th-century American male writers
21st-century American male writers
21st-century American non-fiction writers
American atheists
American film critics
American male non-fiction writers
American people of Spanish descent
American podcasters
California socialists
American gay writers
Jeopardy! contestants
LGBT people from Georgia (U.S. state)
Former Roman Catholics
People from East Point, Georgia
People from West Hollywood, California
Vanderbilt University alumni
Writers from Georgia (U.S. state)
The Young Turks people